Herlazhofen is a village in the South-German region Allgäu. It is part of the town Leutkirch im Allgäu. The population is approximately 1000 inhabitants.

References

Villages in Baden-Württemberg